Stylopoda groteana is a species of moth in the family Noctuidae (the owlet moths). It is found in North America.

The MONA or Hodges number for Stylopoda groteana is 10165.

References

Further reading

 
 
 

Noctuidae
Articles created by Qbugbot
Moths described in 1903